The 2009 COSAFA Cup is the 13th edition of the football tournament that involves teams from Southern Africa.

South Africa had originally expressed an interest in hosting the 2009 and 2010 events but later reneged and Zimbabwe was given the task to host the tournament.

Madagascar were to take part in the competition as the fourth team in group A, but withdrew.   South Africa and Angola will take part with a Development XI and an U-20 squad respectively, and their matches will not be counted as A internationals by FIFA.

Group stage

Group A

Group B

Knockout stage

Bracket

Quarter-finals

Semi-finals

3rd place

Final

Goalscorers 

4 goals:
  Cuthbert Malajila

2 goals:
  Thabiso Maile
  Mathokoza Thwala
  Nyasha Mushekwi

1 goal:
  Malepa Bolelang
  Pontsho Moloi
  Mosimanegape Ramoshibidu
  Ahmed Ali
  Mohamed Mouigini
  Mokone Marabe
  Momed Hagi
  Josemar
  Don Anakora
  Nelson Laurence
  Malungisa Dlamini
  Mfanzile Dlamini
  Ndoda Mthethwa
  Henry Banda
  Enock Sakala
  Felix Sunzu
  Stophira Sunzu
  Evans Gwekwerere
  Mthulisi Maphosa
  Phillip Marufu
  Method Mwanjali
  Lennox Bacela
  Joseph Makhanya
  Oupa Manyisa

External links 
 Official Homepage of COSAFA

References 

2009
2009 in Zimbabwean sport
2009 in African football
International association football competitions hosted by Zimbabwe